The Enemy (published in 2004) is the eighth book in the Jack Reacher series written by Lee Child. It is narrated in the first person.

Plot summary
In the last hours of 1989, Major Gen. Kenneth Kramer dies of a heart attack in a seedy North Carolina motel, apparently while in the company of a prostitute. Army MP Major Jack Reacher investigates and comes to the conclusion that the woman Kramer was with stole his briefcase. Reacher's superior, Col. Leon Garber, orders him to deliver news of the general's death to his wife. Accompanied by a female officer, Lieutenant Summer, Reacher travels to her house in Virginia. When they arrive, however, they find evidence of a break-in, as well as Mrs. Kramer's body.

Reacher returns to the bar across the street from the motel in an attempt to identify the alleged prostitute. He gets into a fight with a bouncer, breaking his knee. Afterwards, Reacher is told by the motel's night clerk that he heard a military vehicle leaving after Kramer's death, and Reacher concludes that the woman Kramer was with is a female army officer. He is later confronted by two officers, Col. Coomer and Brigadier Gen. Vassell, members of Kramer's staff, who inquire about the briefcase but leave after Reacher mentions Ms. Kramer's death.

Later, a Delta Force soldier, Christopher Carbone, is found murdered in a manner that suggests he was gay. Garber is suddenly transferred to a new command in South Korea and replaced with Col. Willard, a deeply unpleasant bureaucrat who instructs Reacher to write off Carbone's death as an accident. He also reveals that Carbone filed a complaint against Reacher accusing him of assaulting the bouncer, and that he intends to use it as evidence that Reacher killed Carbone unless he closes the investigation quickly.

Shortly thereafter, another murder is reported: David Brubaker, Carbone's CO, is found shot dead in a Columbia alleyway with money and heroin in his pocket. Believing that the two murders are connected, Reacher and Summer focus on the one thing missing from Kramer's newly recovered briefcase: the printed agenda from a conference he was supposed to attend for members of the armored divisions. Coomer and Vassell deny that such an agenda exists, and Willard begins to turn up the pressure on Reacher, forcing him to rely on his wits, contacts in the military police, and years of experience as he tries to unravel the true reason why Kramer's briefcase was stolen.

In the midst of it all, he receives a call from his older brother Joe informing him that his elderly mother Josephine has died from cancer in Paris. Despite having been assured by Josephine earlier that she was ready to die, Reacher feels her loss immensely.

After returning to the United States with Summer following his mother's funeral, Reacher secures a meeting with the Chief of Staff, and reveals his findings: with the collapse of the Soviet Union imminent, the army is preparing to downsize its armored units in favor of infantry, and Kramer and his fellow officers, not wanting to lose their prestigious jobs and perks, were preparing to orchestrate an elaborate public relations and lobbying scheme to persuade Congress and the American people to reject the plan. Having foreseen this, the Chief admits that he arranged for twenty of the army's best investigators, including Reacher, to be assigned to specific posts across the world on a specific day, using forged orders from Garber, so that they would be in a position to prevent such manipulations. He provides Reacher with evidence of his claims, and notes that the Secretary of Defense was also working with the plotters.

Reacher deduces that Kramer was gay, and that he met Carbone at the motel, who stole his briefcase when he died and informed Brubaker of the contents. He also set up Reacher to be charged with assault to cover his tracks. Coomer and Vassell, eager to recover the briefcase, set up an exchange between Carbone and their gofer Maj. Marshall; Marshall killed Carbone and then murdered Brubaker as well before he could use the information. He also killed Ms. Kramer while searching her house for the case; Reacher realizes that Marshall also had a relationship with Kramer and killed his wife out of anger and jealousy.

Reacher travels to California and arrests Vassell and Coomer for conspiracy to commit homicide. He then travels to a firing range in the Mojave Desert where Marshall is conducting firing exercises to arrest him as well. Marshall attempts to commit suicide by maneuvering the tanks into firing on his position, but Reacher shoots him in the shoulder and takes him into custody. The missing agenda is subsequently retrieved from Carbone's billet: it contains a plan to assassinate eighteen prominent infantry officers, including many rising stars, to cripple their modernization efforts. The evidence is turned over to military authorities, and the accused are sentenced to life imprisonment for their crimes.

Reacher is informed that, due to the charge filed by Carbone, he will be demoted to the rank of Captain unless he denies it, which his lawyer encourages him to do. Instead, Reacher accepts the charge to avoid disgracing Carbone's memory further, and looks forward to serving on the front lines again. Before accepting his new command, he tracks down the corrupt Willard and executes him in his own house, planting drugs on the body to hide his involvement. The story ends with Reacher reflecting on the fact that he never saw Summer again despite hearing that she also received a promotion to Captain.

Awards and nominations
2005 Dilys Award nomination.
2005 Barry Award winner, Best Novel.

References

External links
 The Enemy information page on Lee Child's official website.

2004 British novels
Jack Reacher books
Novels by Lee Child
Fiction set in 1989
Novels set in North Carolina
Nero Award-winning works
Barry Award-winning works
First-person narrative novels
Bantam Press books
Delacorte Press books